Resurrection is a 1593 oil on canvas painting by Annibale Carracci, now in the Louvre in Paris, whose Cabinet des Dessins also houses a preparatory study for the work. It is also known as the Angelelli Resurrection after the Bolognese family which long owned it. It is signed and dated ANNIBAL CARRATIUS PINGEBAT. MDXCIII.

It was originally produced for the private chapel in the Palazzo Luchini in Bologna, a palace later ceded to the Angelelli family along with the painting, though they later gave the latter to the Corpus Domini monastery in Bologna, where it hung in the chapel dedicated to Catherine of Bologna. It had already reached a high price by the end of the 17th century, one of the highest recorded for that period. The work was seized by the French occupiers in 1797 and not returned to Italy after the end of the Napoleonic Wars.

References
	

1593 paintings
Paintings by Annibale Carracci
Paintings in the Louvre by Italian artists
Carraci